Evelyne Lallemand was a French writer, noted for her continuation of Enid Blyton's The Secret Seven  in the 1970s, producing an additional eleven books to add to Blyton's fifteen. Nine of them were translated into English by Anthea Bell between 1983 and 1987.

Lallemand also worked alongside Viviane Cohen and Colette David in writing and illustrating 24 Mr. Men and Little Miss books after the death of Roger Hargreaves in 1988. 13 of those stories were translated into English and became a part of the main series.

References

French children's writers
French women children's writers
20th-century French non-fiction writers
Year of birth missing
Possibly living people
20th-century French women writers